Krzysztof Kononowicz also known as Konon, Mleczny Człowiek (the Milky Man), Kandydat na Kandydata (Candidate-to-be), Knur (Pig), Ostatni Chuj Polski (the Last Prick of Poland) (born 21 January 1963, in Kętrzyn) is a Polish Politician, internet celebrity and social activist. In 2006, he ran for mayor of Białystok during the local elections in Poland. He attracted notoriety for his purposely unsophisticated political advertisement, first aired on local TV and featured heavily on YouTube.

Biography 
Krzysztof Kononowicz comes from a family of Belarusian origin. His parents lived in the Byelorussian Soviet Socialist Republic, part of the Soviet Union. They came to Poland in 1958. They lived in the village of Wilkowo, near Kętrzyn.

In 2006, Krzysztof Kononowicz, a 43-year-old driver-mechanic living with his widowed mother Leonarda (now deceased), became a candidate of the electoral committee Podlachia of the 21st Century (Podlasie XXI Wieku). Several weeks before the elections, Adam Czeczetkowicz, an activist of the fringe far-right Polish National Party (supported by the party leader Leszek Bubel), convinced him to run for mayor and make the advertisement. Within several days, over 3 million Internet users had seen the commercial on YouTube (English version), posted by Kononowicz's electoral committee. The video also made it to Polish national TV. Soon merchandise (including the characteristic sweater supposedly belonging to Kononowicz) were being sold on the Internet.

Kononowicz got only 1,676 votes (1.9%), but became the most remembered person of the 2006 elections, featured as a guest in several television shows. He became a popular Internet meme in Poland in late 2006 and early 2007. He was also voted "personality of the year" in the poll by the Polish web portal Onet.pl. In several interviews, he stated that he wants to be a candidate for the President of Poland at the next election, while Czeczetkowicz's representatives said they wanted him to be a candidate for the post of mayor of Warsaw.

It is unclear if Kononowicz himself was aware, in the beginning, that his newly established "popularity" was highly derogatory. The leading Polish politician Donald Tusk called him "an unfortunate man". Foreign press described him as "like Borat, except not acting but the real thing".

In March 2007, Kononowicz was accused by his neighbours of abusing his elderly mother. Both Kononowicz and his mother denied the accusations, but the police still decided to investigate. The investigation ended two months later and Kononowicz was cleared of all charges.

He was featured in the 2010 movie Ciacho directed by Patryk Vega as a prosecutor, much to reviewers' acclaim, especially given the movie being a flop.

In December 2018, Kononowicz announced his candidacy for President of Poland.

References 

People from Kętrzyn
People from East Prussia
People from Białystok
Polish people of Belarusian descent
Solidarity (Polish trade union) activists
Internet memes
Polish politicians
Polish bloggers
Male bloggers
Polish YouTubers
Living people
1963 births